Shila Khodadad (born November 5, 1980) is an Iranian actress. She has played in some films such as Marriage, Iranian Style, Saint Petersburg and in a famous Iranian TV series,  Traveler from India.

Shila Khodadad has a BA in Chemistry. She was discovered by renowned director Mas’ood Kimiyaee and made her film debut in 2000 with Objection.

Filmography

Television drama
Traveler from India (2001)
SMS from another World (2008)
Standardized Patient (2016)
The Monster (2019)

Cinema
 Saint Petersburg (2010)
 Marriage, Iranian Style (2006)

References

External links
Shila Khodadad On Instagram
Shila Khodadad On IMDb

1980 births
Living people
Actresses from Tehran
Iranian film actresses
Iranian television actresses
Islamic Azad University alumni
Iranian people of Kurdish descent